Jake Shorrocks (born 26 October 1995) is a professional rugby league footballer who plays as a  or  for the Toulouse Olympique in the Betfred Championship.

Background
Shorrocks was born in Wigan, Greater Manchester, England.

Playing career

Wigan Warriors
He has spent time on loan from Wigan at Workington Town and the Swinton Lions in the Championship, and the Salford Red Devils in the Super League.

Newcastle Thunder
On 22 December 2020 it was announced that Shorrocks would leave Wigan at the end of the 2020 season to join the Newcastle Thunder with team-mate Josh Woods.

References

External links
Wigan Warriors profile
SL profile

1995 births
Living people
Newcastle Thunder players
Rugby league halfbacks
Rugby league players from Wigan
Salford Red Devils players
Swinton Lions players
Toulouse Olympique players
Wigan Warriors players
Workington Town players